The Ìjẹ̀bú people are a sub-ethnic group hailing from Nigeria. They are a part of the broader Yoruba people who are native to south-central Yorubaland, located in the southwest of the country. The Ijebu people speak the Ijebu language, a dialect of the Yoruba language.

Description 
The Ijebu share boundaries on the north with the Ibadan, on the west with the Egba  and on the east with the Ilaje, all of which are other subgroups of the Yoruba. The Ijebus are one of the most populous of all of the sub-ethnic groups of the broader Yoruba ethnic group. and were allegedly the first Yoruba sub-ethnic group to establish relations with the Europeans in the 15th century. The Ijebus, though split into various divisions (including Ijebu Ode, Ijebu Igbo, Ijebu Imushin, Ijebu Ife and Ijebu Ososa), see themselves as united under the leadership and authority of the monarchical Awujale, who is seated in Ijebu Ode. The Ijebu people are known for the trade and production of cassava flakes (popularly known as Garri).

They are industrious and known to be thrifty. Many industrialists in Nigeria are of Ijebu stock. This include Chief Adeola Odutola, Senator Jubril Martins-Kuye, Chief Okusanya Okunowo, Mike Adenuga. The paramount ruler and leader is Oba Sikiru Adetona, the Awujale of Ijebuland who has been on the throne for 61 years. He ascended the throne at the age of 25.

References 

Indigenous peoples of West Africa
Yoruba subgroups